Asthram is a 1983 Indian Malayalam-language film directed by P. N. Menon. The film stars Bharath Gopi, Mammootty, Mohanlal, Nedumudi Venu and Jyothi in the lead roles. The film has musical score by Shyam. This movie  is loosely based on the Nanavati murder case. Author Bibekanada Ray described the film as one of Menon's films "dealing with various contemporary political and social concerns" in her book about India's offbeat cinema.

Plot
Capt. C. S. Nair, a Naval officer, and Rekha constitute a happily married couple. Inspector Stephen and captain are good friends. When the captain leaves for his job, Rekha has to spend a lonely life in their big mansion. She occasionally takes a drive and spends time with Stephen's daughter Lilly. The Captain's elder sister Sharada, who was staying separate from her husband, had a kid Biju. Sharada had died of a tumor and since then Rekha was taking care of Biju like her own son.

During the next occasion of leave, when captain is informed that Sharada is no more, he suggests to admit Biju in a boarding school, so that he gets the best schooling possible. The Captain meets Balu, a photographer, accidentally, he likes him very much and treats him as his own brother. They spend times together along with Balu's friends in outings and other leisure events.

Captain leaves for his job and Rekha and Balu fall in an affair accidentally. Balu realizes that it is a mistrust and runs away from the affair. Rekha had a difficult time to recover from the incident. However she could not conceal it for long, and during the next visit of the Captain she discloses about the affair. Though she doesn't reveal the man, the Captain traces that Balu is the culprit owing to the indifference in behaviour of Balu.

As he couldn't be the same husband again, Captain insists that Balu marry Rekha, which Balu declines, leading to what is in his mind, forming the climax.

Cast

Bharath Gopi as Captain C. S. Nair
Mammootty as Balu
Mohanlal as Dasan
Nedumudi Venu as Krishnanunni
Jyothi as Rekha
Sukumari as Sharada Chechi
Jagathy Sreekumar as Philip
Sankaradi as Nanu Maashu
Isaac Thomas as Dr. Thomas
Jesey as Rev. Father
Lissy as Lilly
Vijayan
Balan K. Nair as Stephen
Bhagyalakshmi
Chamundeswary
Master Twinku as Biju
Meghanathan as Johny
Punnapra Appachan
 Chamundeswari

Soundtrack
The music was composed by Shyam and the lyrics were written by Poovachal Khader and Sathyan Anthikkad.

References

External links
 

1983 films
1980s Malayalam-language films
Films directed by P. N. Menon (director)